Isabel Graciela Dotti de Miatello (born 1947) is an Argentine mathematician specializing in the connections between group theory and differential topology, including the theory of complex nilmanifolds, nilpotent Lie groups, hypercomplex manifolds, and hyperkähler manifolds. She is a professor in the Faculty of Mathematics, Astronomy and Physics of the National University of Córdoba.

Education and career
She earned a bachelor's degree in mathematics in 1970 at the National University of Córdoba, and completed a doctorate at Rutgers University in the United States in 1976. Her dissertation, Extension of Actions on Stiefel Manifolds, was supervised by Glen Bredon.

After temporary positions at the Federal University of Pernambuco in Brazil, at Rutgers, and at the National University of Córdoba, she obtained a permanent faculty position at the National University of Córdoba in 1983.

Recognition
Dotti is a numbered member of the National Academy of Sciences of Argentina, elected in 2007.

References

External links
Home page

1947 births
Living people
Argentine mathematicians
Argentine women mathematicians
National University of Córdoba alumni
Rutgers University alumni
Academic staff of the National University of Córdoba